William Cain may refer to:

William Cain (American politician) (1792–1878), lieutenant governor of South Carolina 
William Cain (Australian politician), Mayor of Melbourne, Australia (1887) and member of the Victorian Legislative Council (1902–1904)
William Cain (sea captain) (1862–1932), Manx master mariner
Sir William Cain, 1st Baronet (1864–1924), English brewer and philanthropist
William Cain (cricketer) (1899–1981), Australian cricketer
William Cain (deemster) (1935–2021), Manx judge
Bill Cain (athletic director) (fl. 1975–1980), American athletic director
Bill Cain (basketball) (fl. 1970), player in Iowa State Cyclones men's basketball
Bill Cain (fl. 1990s–2000s), American playwright

See also
William Caine (disambiguation)
William Kane (disambiguation)
Cain (disambiguation)